Paisley South by-election may refer to one of two parliamentary by-elections held in the constituency of Paisley South in Renfrewshire, Scotland:

 1990 Paisley South by-election
 1997 Paisley South by-election

See also
 Paisley by-election (disambiguation)